Dharmjeet Singh Thakur is an Indian politician. He was elected to the Chhattisgarh Legislative Assembly from Lormi in the 2018 Chhattisgarh Legislative Assembly election as a member of the Janta Congress Chhattisgarh.

References

1953 births
Living people
Janta Congress Chhattisgarh politicians
Indian National Congress politicians from Chhattisgarh
People from Bilaspur, Chhattisgarh
Chhattisgarh MLAs 2018–2023
Chhattisgarh MLAs 2003–2008
Chhattisgarh MLAs 2008–2013